Sholur is a panchayat town in The Nilgiris district in the Indian state of Tamil Nadu.

Demographics

 India census, Sholur had a population of 11,297. Males constitute 50% of the population and females 50%. Sholur has an average literacy rate of 59%, lower than the national average of 59.5%: male literacy is 70%, and female literacy is 48%. In Sholur, 11% of the population is under 6 years of age.

This village consist of six small hamlets named Ooratty, Kotatty, Bickaikandy, Hosahatty, Thattaneri and Backodai.  A common junction for all the hamlets is Nagarthanai which is also a entrance to the village. Most of the population speaks native language Badaga. Sholur produces seasonal vegetables like potato, cabbage, carrot, and garlic.

References

Cities and towns in Nilgiris district